This article contains lists of men's national water polo team rosters of the United States of America. The lists are updated as of March 30, 2020.

Abbreviations

Olympic Games

Men's water polo tournaments have been staged at the Olympic Games since 1900. The United States has participated in 22 of 27 tournaments.

  1904 St. Louis –  Gold,  Silver,  Bronze medals (Demonstration event)
 New York Athletic Club: David Bratton, Budd Goodwin, Louis Handley, David Hesser, Joe Ruddy, James Steen, George Van Cleaf. Head coach: Gus Sundstrom.
 Chicago Athletic Association: Rex Beach, David Hammond, Charles Healy, Frank Kehoe, Jerome Steever, Edwin Swatek, Bill Tuttle. Head coach: Alex Meffert.
 Missouri Athletic Club: Gwynne Evans, Gus Goessling, John Meyers, Bill Orthwein, Amedee Reyburn, Frank Schreiner, Manfred Toeppen.
  1920 Antwerp – 4th place
 Clement Browne, James Carson, Harry Hebner (C), Sophus Jensen, Mike McDermott, Perry McGillivray, Norman Ross, Preston Steiger, Herbert Taylor, Herb Vollmer, William Vosburgh. Head coach: Otto Wahle.
  1924 Paris –  Bronze medal
 Art Austin, Elmer Collett (GK), Jam Handy, Oliver Horn, Fred Lauer (GK), George Mitchell, John Norton, Wally O'Connor, George Schroth, Herb Vollmer (C), Johnny Weissmuller. Head coach: Harry Hebner (did not go) / Otto Wahle.
  1928 Amsterdam – 7th place
 John Cattus (GK), Harry Daniels (GK), Joseph Farley, Richard Greenberg, Sam Greller, George Mitchell (C), Wally O'Connor, Paul Samson, George Schroth, Herbert Topp, Johnny Weissmuller. Head coach: Perry McGillivray.
  1932 Los Angeles –  Bronze medal
 Austin Clapp, Phil Daubenspeck, Charley Finn, Harold McCallister, Wally O'Connor (C), Cal Strong, Herb Wildman (GK). Head coach: Frank Rivas.
  1936 Berlin – 9th place
 Kenneth Beck, Phil Daubenspeck, Charley Finn, Dixon Fiske, Fred Lauer (GK), Harold McCallister, Wally O'Connor (C), Ray Ruddy, Herb Wildman (GK). Head coach: Clyde Swendsen.
  1948 London – 11th place
 Kenneth Beck, Bob Bray, Ralph Budelman (GK), Lee Case, Chris Christensen, Harold Dash, Dixon Fiske, Edwin Knox (C). Head coach: Austin Clapp.
  1952 Helsinki – 4th place
 Harry Bisbey (GK), Marvin Burns, Bill Dornblaser, Bob Hughes, Edward Jaworski, Bill Kooistra, Norman Lake, Jim Norris (C), Jack Spargo, Peter Stange. Head coach: Urho Saari.
  1956 Melbourne – 5th place
 Bob Frojen, Jim Gaughran, Ken Hahn (GK), Robert Horn (GK), Bob Hughes, Bill Kooistra (C), Sam Kooistra, Bill Ross, Ronald Severa, Wally Wolf. Head coach: Neil Kohlhase.
  1960 Rome – 7th place
 Chuck Bittick, Marvin Burns, Ron Crawford, Gordie Hall (GK), Robert Horn (GK), Chick McIlroy, Ronald Severa, Fred Tisue, Ron Volmer, Wally Wolf. Head coach: Neil Kohlhase.
  1964 Tokyo – 9th place
 Tony van Dorp (GK), Ron Crawford, Dave Ashleigh, Ned McIlroy, Chick McIlroy, Stan Cole, Bob Saari, Dan Drown, Paul McIlroy, Ralph Whitney, George Stransky (GK). Head coach: Urho Saari.
  1968 Mexico City – 5th place
 Tony van Dorp (GK), Dave Ashleigh (C), Russ Webb, Ron Crawford, Stan Cole, Bruce Bradley, Dean Willeford, Barry Weitzenberg, Gary Sheerer, John Parker, Steve Barnett (GK). Head coach: Art Lambert.
  1972 Munich –  Bronze medal
 Jim Slatton (GK), Stan Cole, Russ Webb, Barry Weitzenberg, Gary Sheerer (C), Bruce Bradley, Peter Asch, Jim Ferguson, Steve Barnett (GK), John Parker, Eric Lindroth. Head coach: Monte Nitzkowski.
  1976 Montreal – Did not qualify
  1980 Moscow – Qualified but withdrew
 Chris Dorst (GK), Gary Figueroa, Steve Hamann (GK), Eric Lindroth, Drew McDonald, Kevin Robertson, Peter Schnugg, Terry Schroeder, John Siman, Jon Svendsen, Joe Vargas. Head coach: Monte Nitzkowski.
  1984 Los Angeles –  Silver medal
 Craig Wilson (GK), Kevin Robertson, Gary Figueroa, Peter Campbell, Doug Burke, Joe Vargas, Jon Svendsen, John Siman, Drew McDonald, Terry Schroeder (C), Jody Campbell, Tim Shaw, Chris Dorst (GK). Head coach: Monte Nitzkowski.
  1988 Seoul –  Silver medal
 Craig Wilson (GK), Kevin Robertson, James Bergeson, Peter Campbell, Doug Kimbell, Craig Klass, Alan Mouchawar, Jeff Campbell, Greg Boyer, Terry Schroeder (C), Jody Campbell, Chris Duplanty (GK), Mike Evans. Head coach: Bill Barnett.
  1992 Barcelona – 4th place
 Craig Wilson (GK), John Vargas, Chris Duplanty (GK), Mike Evans, Doug Kimbell, Charlie Harris, Kirk Everist, Jeff Campbell, Chris Humbert, Terry Schroeder (C), Craig Klass, Erich Fischer, Alex Rousseau. Head coach: Bill Barnett.
  1996 Atlanta – 7th place
 Chris Duplanty (Captain, GK), Dan Hackett (GK), Jeremy Laster, Kyle Kopp, Chris Oeding, Gavin Arroyo, Alex Rousseau, Rick McNair, Kirk Everist, Chris Humbert, Mike Evans, Troy Barnhart, Jr., Wolf Wigo. Head coach: Richard Corso.
  2000 Sydney – 6th place
 Dan Hackett (GK), Chi Kredell, Robert Lynn, Kyle Kopp, Chris Oeding (C), Gavin Arroyo, Brad Schumacher, Tony Azevedo, Wolf Wigo, Chris Humbert, Sean Kern, Sean Nolan (GK), Ryan Bailey. Head coach: John Vargas.
  2004 Athens – 7th place
 Brandon Brooks (GK), Wolf Wigo (C), Omar Amr, Jeff Powers, Adam Wright, Chris Segesman, Layne Beaubien, Tony Azevedo, Dan Klatt, Brett Ormsby, Jesse Smith, Genai Kerr (GK), Ryan Bailey. Head coach: Ratko Rudić.
  2008 Beijing –  Silver medal
 Merrill Moses (GK), Peter Varellas, Peter Hudnut, Jeff Powers, Adam Wright, Rick Merlo, Layne Beaubien, Tony Azevedo (C), Ryan Bailey, Tim Hutten, Jesse Smith, J. W. Krumpholz, Brandon Brooks (GK). Head coach: Terry Schroeder.
  2012 London – 8th place
 Merrill Moses (GK), Peter Varellas, Peter Hudnut, Jeff Powers, Adam Wright, Shea Buckner, Layne Beaubien, Tony Azevedo (C), Ryan Bailey, Tim Hutten, Jesse Smith, John Mann, Chay Lapin (GK). Head coach: Terry Schroeder.
  2016 Rio de Janeiro – 10th place
 Merrill Moses (GK), Thomas Dunstan, Ben Hallock, Alex Obert, Alex Roelse, Luca Cupido, Josh Samuels, Tony Azevedo (C), Alex Bowen, Bret Bonanni, Jesse Smith, John Mann, McQuin Baron (GK). Head coach: Dejan Udovičić.

World Aquatics Championships
Men's water polo tournaments have been staged at the World Aquatics Championships since 1973. The United States has participated in 18 of 18 tournaments.

  2005 Montreal – 11th place
 Brandon Brooks (GK), Ryan Bailey, J. W. Krumpholz, Jeff Powers, Adam Wright, Peter Hudnut, Rick Merlo, Tony Azevedo (C), Spencer Dornin, Brian Alexander, Jesse Smith, Nathaniel Bennett (GK), Shea Buckner. Head coach: Guy Baker.
  2007 Melbourne – 9th place
 Merrill Moses (GK), Peter Varellas, Dreason Barry, Jeff Powers, Adam Wright, Kevin Witt, Ryan Bailey, Tony Azevedo (C), Rick Merlo, Layne Beaubien, Jesse Smith, Brian Alexander, Genai Kerr (GK). Head coach: Ricardo Azevedo.
  2009 Rome – 4th place
 Merrill Moses (GK), Peter Varellas, Brian Alexander, Jeff Powers, Adam Wright, Justin Johnson, Layne Beaubien, Tony Azevedo (C), Ryan Bailey, Tim Hutten, Jesse Smith, J. W. Krumpholz, Genai Kerr (GK). Head coach: Terry Schroeder.
  2011 Shanghai – 6th place
 Merrill Moses (GK), Peter Varellas, Peter Hudnut, Jeff Powers, Adam Wright, Brian Alexander, Layne Beaubien, Tony Azevedo (C), Ryan Bailey, Tim Hutten, Jesse Smith, Shea Buckner, Andy Stevens (GK). Head coach: Terry Schroeder.
  2013 Barcelona – 9th place
 Merrill Moses (GK), Janson Wigo, Alex Obert, Alex Bowen, Matthew de Trane, Chancellor Ramirez, J. W. Krumpholz, Tony Azevedo (C), Shea Buckner, Tim Hutten, Michael Rosenthal, John Mann, Andy Stevens (GK). Head coach: Dejan Udovičić.
  2015 Kazan – 7th place
 Merrill Moses (GK), Nikola Vavić, Alex Obert, Jackson Kimbell, Alex Roelse, Luca Cupido, Josh Samuels, Tony Azevedo (C), Alex Bowen, Bret Bonanni, Jesse Smith, John Mann, McQuin Baron (GK). Head coach: Dejan Udovičić.
  2017 Budapest – 13th place
 McQuin Baron (GK), Johnny Hooper, Marko Vavic, Alex Obert (C), Ben Hallock, Luca Cupido, Thomas Dunstan, Nic Carniglia, Alex Bowen, Chancellor Ramirez, Alex Roelse, Max Irving, Drew Holland (GK). Head coach: Dejan Udovičić.
  2019 Gwangju – 9th place
 Alex Wolf (GK), Johnny Hooper, Marko Vavic, Alex Obert, Ben Hallock, Luca Cupido, Hannes Daube, Matthew Farmer, Alex Bowen, Chancellor Ramirez, Jesse Smith (C), Max Irving, Drew Holland (GK). Head coach: Dejan Udovičić.

FINA World Cup
The FINA Men's Water Polo World Cup was established in 1979. The United States has participated in 15 of 16 tournaments.

  1991 Barcelona –  Gold medal
 Jeff Campbell, Mike Evans, Erich Fischer, Charlie Harris, Chris Humbert, David Imbernino, Doug Kimbell, Craig Klass, Robert Lynn, Kames Makshanoff (GK), Terry Schroeder (C), John Vargas, Craig Wilson (GK). Head coach: Bill Barnett.
  1997 Athens –  Gold medal
 Gavin Arroyo, Ryan Bailey, Chris Duplanty (GK), Dan Hackett (GK), Chris Humbert, Kyle Kopp, Chi Kredel, Jeremy Laster, Drew Netherton, Chris Oeding, Brad Schumacher, Peter Stern, Wolf Wigo. Head coach: John Vargas.
  2010 Oradea – 4th place
 Merrill Moses (GK), Peter Varellas, Mike Sharf, Jeff Powers, Adam Wright, Jeff Tyrell, Thomas Hopkins, Tony Azevedo (C), Ryan Bailey, Tim Hutten, Jesse Smith, Tommy Corcoran, Andy Stevens (GK). Head coach: Terry Schroeder.
  2014 Almaty – 4th place
 McQuin Baron (GK), Conner Cleary, Nolan McConnell, Alex Obert, Alex Bowen, Bret Bonanni, Josh Samuels, Michael Rosenthal, John Mann, Luca Cupido, Jesse Smith, Ryder Roberts, Merrill Moses (GK). Head coach: Dejan Udovičić.
  2018 Berlin – 6th place
 McQuin Baron (GK), Johnny Hooper, Dylan Woodhead, Alex Obert, Ben Hallock, Luca Cupido, Nic Carniglia, Alex Roelse, Alex Bowen, Ben Stevenson, Jesse Smith (C), Max Irving, Jack Turner (GK). Head coach: Dejan Udovičić.

Pan American Games
Men's water polo tournaments have been staged at the Pan American Games since 1951. The United States has participated in 18 of 18 tournaments.

  1975 Mexico City –  Silver medal
 Guy Antley (GK), Peter Asch, Paul Becsahazy, Thomas Belfonti, Jim Ferguson, Steve Hamann (GK), Jim Kruse, Eric Lindroth, Mike Loughlin, Peter Schnugg, Jon Svendsen. Head coach: Pete Cutino.
  2007 Rio de Janeiro –  Gold medal
 Merrill Moses (GK), Peter Varellas, Peter Hudnut, Jeff Powers, Adam Wright, Kevin Witt, Ryan Bailey, Tony Azevedo (C), Thomas Hopkins, Layne Beaubien, Jesse Smith, John Mann, Genai Kerr (GK). Head coach: Terry Schroeder.
  2011 Guadalajara –  Gold medal
 Merrill Moses (GK), Peter Varellas, Peter Hudnut, Jeff Powers, Adam Wright, Brian Alexander, Layne Beaubien, Tony Azevedo (C), Ryan Bailey, Tim Hutten, Jesse Smith, J. W. Krumpholz, Chay Lapin (GK). Head coach: Terry Schroeder.
  2015 Toronto –  Gold medal
 Merrill Moses (GK), Nikola Vavić, Alex Obert, Jackson Kimbell, Alex Roelse, Luca Cupido, Josh Samuels, Tony Azevedo (C), Alex Bowen, Bret Bonanni, Jesse Smith, John Mann, McQuin Baron (GK). Head coach: Dejan Udovičić.
  2019 Lima –  Gold medal
 Alex Wolf (GK), Johnny Hooper, Marko Vavic, Alex Obert, Ben Hallock, Luca Cupido, Hannes Daube, Max Irving, Alex Bowen, Chancellor Ramirez, Jesse Smith (C). Head coach: Dejan Udovičić.

See also
 List of United States men's Olympic water polo team rosters
 United States men's national water polo team
 United States women's national water polo team
 List of United States women's national water polo team rosters

Notes

References

External links
 Official website

Men's national rosters
National men's rosters
United States National men's rosters